Dimethoxyphenethylamine may refer to:

 2,3-Dimethoxyphenethylamine
 2,4-Dimethoxyphenethylamine
 2,5-Dimethoxyphenethylamine
 2,6-Dimethoxyphenethylamine
 3,4-Dimethoxyphenethylamine